Anarnittuq Island is an uninhabited island in the Qikiqtaaluk Region of Nunavut, Canada. It is located in Baffin Island's Cumberland Sound. It lies at the combined mouths of Clearwater and Shark Fiord, between Clear Passage Island (to its west) and Kekertelung Island (to its east). The Sanigut Islands (including Aupaluktok Island), Iglunga Island, and Nunatak Island are in the vicinity.

Another island, Maittuq formerly Anarnittuq Island lies just south of Naujaat, where Roes Welcome Sound joins Frozen Strait, near Beach Point.

References

Islands of Baffin Island
Islands of Cumberland Sound
Uninhabited islands of Qikiqtaaluk Region